Eupogonius pubescens is a species of beetle in the family Cerambycidae. It was described by John Lawrence LeConte in 1873. It is known from the United States.

References

Eupogonius
Beetles described in 1873